Astroloba congesta is a small succulent plant of the Astroloba genus, indigenous to the Eastern Cape, South Africa.

Description

Astroloba congesta is a compact Astroloba species, with circa 7 cm wide stems that are densely covered in sharply-pointed leaves, which sometimes grow in tiers, or in a rough spiral. The leaves are a glossy green in colour, concave on their upper faces, smooth, sharp with slight keels, and point upwards and outwards.

Like its closest relatives -  Astroloba foliolosa and robusta, it produces cream-white flowers in the rainy season (September–January in habitat), tinged with green, on unusually short pedicels. However the inflorescence of congesta is often branched. 
It is easily confused with its close relative to the west, Astroloba foliolosa, and the two species form a transition. Astroloba congesta can be distinguished by its larger, straighter, less compact leaves.

Distribution
It is indigenous to the Eastern Cape Province, South Africa. Here it is confined to the Districts of Albany, Cradock and Bedford. This is an area of relatively high rainfall, 300–450 mm, which falls predominantly in the summer.

"Deltoidea" variety

This smaller form, from rocky areas of the Zuurberg mountains, was previously classed as a separate species, Astroloba deltoidea.  It has smooth, rigid, shiny leaves.

References

Further reading
 Astroloba congesta - Introduction and images 
 Astroloba congesta - SANBI redlist

congesta
Flora of the Cape Provinces